The City of Dublin Steam Packet Company was a shipping line established in 1823.  It served cross-channel routes between Britain and Ireland for over a century. For 70 of those years it transported the mail. It was 'wound-up' by a select committee of the House of Lords in 1922 and finally liquidated in 1930.

The company operated from offices at Eden House, 15-18 Eden Quay which were constructed in 1829.

History
The City of Dublin Steam Packet Company began in Dublin in 1822 as Charles Wye Williams & Company; Williams is one of the unrecognised pioneers of steam navigation. His company initially operated steam ships between Dublin and Liverpool. In 1826, the line added service to London and Belfast. Later, service was also provided between Glasgow and Belfast. Transatlantic service to New York started with the Royal William departing Liverpool on 5 July 1838, becoming the first steamer to depart for an Atlantic crossing from the River Mersey.  In January, 1839, they were awarded a contract to provide a night mail service from Holyhead; their ships docked at the Admiralty Pier in Holyhead. In 1843, the company took over the routes of the St. George Steam Packet Company, extending service to Wales. The Company also operated smaller steamers on the River Shannon.

Up until 1850, the British Admiralty carried the Royal Mail, but in that year, contracts were awarded for the first time to private companies. Ships carrying mail on these contracts were authorized to use the designation RMS or Royal Mail Ship. The most valuable route, with the highest volume, was between Kingstown (now Dún Laoghaire), in Ireland, and Holyhead in Wales. The line won the contract and purchased RMS Saint Columba and RMS Llwywllyn from the Admiralty. In 1859, the line ordered four additional steamers, named for four provinces of Ireland, the RMS Connaught, RMS Leinster, RMS Munster and RMS Ulster; these four were commonly referred to as "The Provinces".

In 1897, the line was awarded an additional 21 years for their contract with the Post Office, the CofDSPCo ordered four identical ships from Cammell Lairds of Birkenhead to replace "The Provinces"; these carried the same names as the former ships. These were twin-propeller vessels powered by an eight-cylinder steam engine, capable of 24 knots.

During World War I, the company lost two steamers sunk by the Germans, the worst of which was the second Leinster which was lost with over 500 lives in 30 metres of water just North East of the Kish Light, the greatest single-incident loss of life in the Irish Sea. (The official death toll was 501. Research by Roy Stokes, author of Death in the Irish Sea: The Sinking of RMS Leinster and Philip Lecane, author of Torpedoed! The RMS Leinster Disaster suggest that the number lost was somewhat higher.) The Company was not able to financially recover from this loss. Afterwards, the remaining fleet were taken over by the British & Irish Steam Packet Company. The City of Dublin Steam Packet Company was finally liquidated in 1924.

Ships operated by the line
Albert 1845
Athlone 1836 (in 1849, Thomas Carlyle sailed to Dublin from London on the Athlone. He gives a lengthy description of his three-day sail from London to Dublin Harbour. The Athlone stopped at Greenwich; Gravesend; Broadstairs; Ramsgate; Deal; Dover' Plymouth and Falmouth before heading out to Ireland. Carlyle. Reminiscences of My Irish Journey in 1849, 1882, pp. 7-37.
Ballinasloe 1829
Banshee 1848
Belfast 1884
Britannia 1825
Carlow 1896
Cavan 1876
City of Dublin 1824
City of Londonderry 1824
Commerce 1825
Connaught (1) 1860
RMS Connaught (2) 1897 (torpedoed and sunk en route Le Havre to Southampton, 1917)
Cork 1899 (torpedoed and sunk off Point Lynas, 1918)
Diamond 1846
Duchess of Kent 1837
Duke of Cambridge 1837
Eblana 1849
Emerald 1846
Galway 1891
Gipsy 1828
Hibernia 1824
Ireland 1885
Iron Duke 1844
Kerry 1897
Kildare 1867
Kilkenny 1903
Leeds 1826
Leinster (1) 1860
RMS Leinster (2) 1897 (torpedoed and sunk off Kingstown, 1918; over 500 lives lost out of 771 onboard)
Leitrim 1874
Liffey 1824
Liverpool 1846
RMS Llewellyn 1848
Longford 1870
Louth 1894
Manchester 1826
Mayo 1880
Meath 1884
Mersey 1824
Mona (1) 1825
Mona (2) 1832
Mullingar 1868
Munster (1) 1860
Munster (2) 1896
Nottingham 1827
Pearl 1845
Prince Arthur 1851
Princess 1839
Queen Victoria 1838 (wrecked near Howth Head in snowstorm, 15 February 1853; 80 lives lost)
Roscommon 1845
Royal Adelaide 1838 (wrecked at Tongue Sands off Margate, 1849; 250 lives lost)
Royal William 1837
Shamrock 1824
Sheffield 1827
RMS St. Columba 1848
St. Patrick (see Llewellyn)
Thames 1827
Town of Liverpool 1824
Trafalgar 1848
Ulster (1) 1860
Ulster (2) 1896
 1895
Windsor 1846

See also
 British and Irish Steam Packet Company - operated from offices at 27 Sir John Rogerson's Quay and 46 East Wall and North Wall Quay. It was previously called the Dublin & London Steam Packet Company.
 Dublin & Glasgow Steam Packet Company - operated from offices at 73 North Wall Quay

References

 Freda Harcourt, "Charles Wye William & Irish Steam Shipping", The Journal of Transport History, Vol. 13, No 2, Sept.1992.
Info on The Ships List
Anglesey-Môn Info Web
Sealink-Holyhead.com

External links
 Ship Trafalgar Collection (#1063), East Carolina Manuscript Collection, J. Y. Joyner Library, East Carolina University

Defunct shipping companies of the United Kingdom
Shipping companies of Ireland
Packet (sea transport)
Dublin Docklands